Malaysia–Ukraine relations (Jawi: هوبوڠن مليسيا–أوكرانيا) are foreign relations between Malaysia and Ukraine. Malaysia has an embassy in Kyiv, and Ukraine has an embassy in Kuala Lumpur.

History 
Diplomatic relations between the two countries was established on 3 March 1992, and Malaysia was among the first countries to recognise the independence of Ukraine. In 2003, Malaysian Prime Minister Mahathir Mohamad paid an official visit to meet the President of Ukraine Leonid Kuchma. Since the visit, the relations between these two countries focused on economic, scientific, military-technical and humanitarian aspects. Ukraine praised Malaysia on its Islamic affairs administration and expressed interest in learning from Malaysia's experience in that regard.

Education relations 
Malaysia concluded a Memorandum of Understanding (MoU) with three prominent universities in Ukraine to operate three Offshore Campus Medical Degree Programmes to award local students with the Doctor of Medicine (MD) degree.

Economic relations 
In 2012, Ukraine's exports to Malaysia (estimated at U$236.6 million) included chemical and organic fertilisers and sunflower oil.
Malaysia's exports to Ukraine (around U$125.7 million) included palm oil, electrical machinery and equipment, video and audio equipment, rubber, boilers, industrial machinery and equipment, furniture, plastics and plastic products, cocoa, soaps and other washing preparations equipment.

Further reading 
 The Strengthening of Bilateral Relationship between Ukraine and Malaysia as part of the Foreign Policy of Ukraine in South East-Asia H.E. Ihor V. Humennyi

See also
 Foreign relations of Malaysia
 Foreign relations of Ukraine

References 

 
Ukraine
Bilateral relations of Ukraine